Epiperipatus barbadensis is a species of velvet worm in the Peripatidae family. This species is one of the most common velvet worms kept in captivity. This velvet worm is a homogeneous brown on its dorsal surface. The original description of this species is based on female specimens ranging from 17 mm to 32 mm in length. Females of this species have 31 pairs of legs. The type locality is in Barbados.

References

Onychophorans of tropical America
Onychophoran species
Animals described in 1962